Zwaagdijk-Oost is a linear settlement in the Dutch province of North Holland. It is part of the municipality of Medemblik.

The village was first mentioned in 1319 as buten den Zuoechdyc, and means "the dike belonging to Zwaag. Zwaagdijk-Oost is the settlement on the eastern side of the dike, Zwaagdijk-West is on the western side. In 1954, the Catholic St Jozef church was built in Zwaagdijk-Oost.

References 

Populated places in North Holland
Medemblik